This is a list of the members of the Dewan Negara (Senate) of the Thirteenth Parliament of Malaysia.

Elected by the State Legislative Assembly

Nominated by the Prime Minister and appointed by the Yang di-Pertuan Agong

Death in office
 Norahan Abu Bakar (d. 22 September 2017)

Footnotes

References

13th Parliament of Malaysia
Lists of members of the Dewan Negara